Do Ho Suh (hangul: 서도호, born 1962) is a Korean sculptor and installation artist. He also works across various media, including paintings and film which explore the concept of space and home. His work is particularly well known in relation to anti-monumentalism. His works convey his life experiences, including the homes he has lived in and the diversity of the people he has met. Suh takes inspiration for his unique art form from his nomadic lifestyle, living in many different cities and environments. With the use of a unique, diaphanous fabric medium, Suh highlights intersections between displacement, memories, and environments all through the idea of a "home" space. His focus on traditional techniques and memorializing spaces are used as agents in emphasizing Korean culture and his identity. 

Suh was born in Seoul, South Korea in 1962. He earned a Bachelor of Fine Arts and Master of Fine Arts from Seoul National University in Oriental Painting. He also studied at Rhode Island School of Design, where he received a Bachelor of Fine Arts in painting in 1994. He began to establish himself into the art scene in New York in the late 1990s. Then, in 1997, he received a Master of Fine Arts in sculpture from Yale University. Suh currently has live-in studios located in London, New York City, and Seoul. Suh was named the Wall Street Journal's Innovator of the Year in Art in 2013. He represented Korea at the Venice Biennale in 2001.

Early life 
Do ho Suh's father, Suh Se-Ok, was a famous artist who led an artistic movement in the 1960s. It combined traditional ink paintings with new meanings and concepts from the abstract art movement that was happening in the West. Suh grew up in Seoul, and after failing to get the grades needed to become a marine biologist, he applied for art school. After receiving a master's degree in traditional Korean painting and completing mandatory service in the South Korean military for approximately 2 years after graduating at Seoul National University, he moved to the United States to continue his painting education in 1991. Moving to the US removed the association Suh had to his father, "I felt relieved when I went to the States, I felt much more freedom". This allowed him to make his own work and not be compared to his father.

Travel informs a large amount of his work, during which Suh always carries a sketchbook as a habit acquired during university. These travels and transits between locations, such as in airports and trains, provide inspiration for works as well as their conceptualization. Suh has turned his previous dislike of traveling to a source of inspiration and space for creativity.

Influences 
Suh's work has a central focus on architecture, space, and identity. His early work blended into the gallery space and was barely discernible to the viewer as art. His most famous works are made of nylon or silk skillfully sewn into forms that represent spaces in Suh's life to scale.While Suh has worked with a plethora of mediums in the past, his signature is a translucent polyester thread that is used to make traditional Korean costumes for summer, the texture similar to organza; while using his art as an agent to express his mission, he also incorporates Korean tradition and identity. This inspiration for revolutionizing traditional Korean techniques could be paying homage to his father, who was a well-known artist that practiced the tradition of ink painting and transforming it in novel ways. One of Suh's oldest works is entitled High School Uni-Form (1997). This piece also followed his theme of identity since, more recently, these uni-forms have changed over time. Although this is an outfit that many boys shared at the time, they all have different sentiments when looking back at these uniforms. Although it remains unclear on what this piece really means, identity plays a major role in this breathtaking piece. Immigrating to the United States affected how Suh interpreted home and created an overarching theme in his works where he explores space and how we interact with it. This can be seen in his piece, "Home Within Home Within Home Within Home Within Home" which is a silk replica of his childhood home, as well as his piece "Fallen Star" that featured a traditional Korean home crashing into a Los Angeles building. Suh also challenges the uses of varies materials, for instance, "Do Ho Suh: 348 West 22nd Street" is a work created with luminous swaths of translucent polyester, which features his own history of migration from Korea to New York, a replica of the ground-floor residence when he first arrived the United States. Moving to the US removed the association Suh had to his father, "I felt relieved when I went to the states, I felt much more freedom".

Importance of Fabric 
There is a connection between the use of this diaphanous fabric and its intentions to highlight his Korean roots and identity through his Home Series, specifically the piece Reflection, exhibited in 2007. Reflection is a piece that exemplifies dual dimensions of a gate that was between the main house and the children’s bedroom of his parent’s home in Korea. Suh pays close attention to detail as he replicates every feature, including the dragon and crane design on the brick roof and tiles, creating the piece out of the Korean fabric along with traditional sewing techniques. The color of the piece is a foggy yet eye-catching lake blue, portraying the sereneness of the water-like plane; the space is crafted almost like a meditation room, evoking contemplation. This piece is a literal reflection of his childhood mixed with feelings of nostalgia and confusion when pondering about space, these feelings exacerbated by the blurry effect of the fabric. He incorporates elements of his Korean childhood house, rooting back to his identity and experiences. He plays with the idea of two gateways that could allude to the contemplation of his own identity; he resides in the comfort of his younger years with his Korean identity, yet is questioning the bounds of his new culture, moving to the United States. Suh attempts to use his art to reconnect with his Korean roots and revive the fading memory of his Korean identity, juggling two cultures. 

The unique fabric is also used to highlight themes of displacement, mobility, and transporting memories in different environments. For example, Suh’s piece, 348 West 22nd Street, most aligns with the displacement Suh felt when moving to a new city.  The experience was extremely uncomfortable for him, and he had to find a way to feel established in his surroundings. As a solution, he measured and surveyed every nook and cranny of his environment and eventually investigated how identity is imposed through the duplication and transportation of important spaces. Referencing back to his piece, 348 West 22nd Street is crafted with the same transparent fabric; the colors incorporated are dusty, artificial tones of pink, blue, and yellow, contributing to the New York quality of the space; these aspects are then juxtaposed by the elegance and smoothness of the fabric, suggesting the quality and roots of Korean tradition. Here, he illustrates the duality of his identity by successfully meshing both cultures into a singular space, highlighting how the home acts as a representation of his identity.

Art Techniques 
To emphasize notions of memorializing spaces yet recognizing the temporary nature of homes, Suh often uses the technique of “rubbing.” This technique is the act of putting white paper over the entire interior of a space and coloring on top of it to capture the indents, dimensions, and imperfections to articulate the time and memories spent in the home. From afar, the drawing seems two-dimensional, but as you approach the paper, it is easy to notice the little details accentuated by the rubbing technique. This serves as a metaphor regarding a home and its memories; At first look, it's easy to downplay the importance of a home space, feeling as if it is just an unattached environment. But, once taking a closer look, memories can be evoked through a small scratch on the wall or by the simplicity of a light switch. Suh yearns to memorialize the spaces he lives in, emphasizing the layers of time in the home. He also views rubbing as a loving gesture. He understands the temporary nature of a home, stemming from his nomadic lifestyle, yet he still finds meaning in the importance of the environment as it shapes identity and holds precious memories, even if it was in the past.

Exhibitions
Suh has had solo exhibitions at Storefront for Art and Architecture (2010), the Serpentine Galleries, London (2002), Seattle Art Museum, the Whitney Museum of American Art at Philip Morris, the Artsonje Center in Korea, the 21st Century Museum of Contemporary Art, Kanazawa, Japan (2013), Bildmuseet, Umeå University, Sweden (2017 - 2018), the Smithsonian American Art Museum in Washington, D.C. (2018)  the Los Angeles County Museum of Art (2019 - 2020), the ARoS Aarhus Kunstmuseum in Denmark (2018 - 2019), the Victoria and Albert Museum in London, UK (2019), and the Museum Voorlinden in Netherlands (2019). He has also participated in group exhibitions at the Baltimore Museum of Art, Institute of Contemporary Art, Boston,  Museum of Modern Art, New York, and at the Museum of Fine Arts, Houston, among others. Suh has participated in numerous biennials, including the 49th Venice Biennale in 2001. In 2010, he was shown in the Liverpool Biennial, the Venice Biennale Architecture, and Media City Seoul Biennial, and the 9th Gwangju Biennale in 2012.

Public collections
Suh's work is found in major museum collections worldwide, including the Museum of Modern Art, New York; Whitney Museum of American Art, New York; Solomon R. Guggenheim Museum, New York; Museum of Fine Arts, Houston; Albright–Knox Art Gallery, Buffalo, N.Y.; Minneapolis Institute of Art; Walker Art Center, Minneapolis; Museum of Contemporary Art, Los Angeles; Los Angeles County Museum of Art; Seattle Asian Art Museum, Seattle, WA; Art Gallery of Ontario, Toronto; Tate Modern, London; the Museum of Contemporary Art, Tokyo; the Towada Art Center and Gothenburg; Museum of World Culture.

Selected works include:
Hub-2, Breakfast Corner, 260-7 (2018)
Hub-1, Entrace, 260-7 (2018)
New York City Apartment (2015)
Fallen Star (2012)
348 West 22nd Street (2011-2015)
Net-Work (2010)
Karma (2010)
Home within Home (2009-2011)
Fallen Star 1/5 (2008-2011)
Cause & Effect (2012)
Paratrooper-II (2005)
Paratrooper-V (2005)
Unsung Founders (2005)
Some/One (2005)
Reflection (2004)
Karma Juggler (2004)
Staircase-IV (2004)
Screen (2003)
Doormat: Welcome Back (2003)
The Perfect Home (2002)
Public Figures (1998)
Who Am We? (2000)
Floor (1997-2000)
High School Uni-form (1997)

Public Figures (1998)
Do Ho Suh's Public Figures consists of an empty pedestal supported by a crowd of people, turning the traditional concept of a monument upside down: in fact, the heroic figure does not stand above the pedestal, but with the masses below. Critics have described this work as confronting questions of home, physical space, displacement, memory, individuality and collectivity.
In an interview with Paul Laster for Artkrush, the artist said his work "is an organic way to explore the boundaries of this notion of individualism, in which each individual is the accumulation of so many different and discrete individuals creates a bigger group, a bigger country and a bigger world"

Trivia
One of Suh's works Karma [installed outside the Albright-Knox Art Gallery in Buffalo, NY] has been reproduced in the medical journal Spine. Interpretations of this intriguing sculpture, which features several interconnected men sitting atop one another, each covering the eyes of the man below, vary widely. One of these is that one should follow  one's karma blindly without expecting a reward. This is what Lord Krishna told Arjuna in Mahabharata.

Awards
Ho-Am Prize in the Arts (2017)

References

External links
Lehmann Maupin Gallery
Victoria Miro Gallery
Art:21 -- Art in the Twenty-First Century
TateShots: Do Ho Suh - Staircase-III The artist talks about his installation piece. 25 March 2011.
21st Century Museum of Contemporary Art Kanazawa
Profile overview on Artsy

1962 births
South Korean sculptors
Living people
People from Seoul
Yale University alumni
Seoul National University alumni
South Korean expatriates in the United States
South Korean contemporary artists
Rhode Island School of Design alumni
Recipients of the Ho-Am Prize in the Arts